Francisco Rodrigues de Alencar Filho, known as Chico Alencar (born 19 October 1949), is a Brazilian politician, historian, and writer, affiliated with the Socialism and Liberty Party (PSOL).

Alencar was first elected as a Councillor, representing the city of Rio de Janeiro for two consecutive terms (1989-92 and 1993-97). He was also elected as a state deputy, representing the state of Rio de Janeiro at the Legislative Assembly of Rio de Janeiro for a single term (1999-2003) and as a federal deputy representing the state of Rio de Janeiro at the Chamber of Deputies of Brazil for four consecutive terms (2003-07; 2007-11; 2011-15 and 2015-19).

He left the Workers' Party (PT) in 2005, along with one of his partners Plínio de Arruda Sampaio, after the expulsion of Luciana Genro, Heloísa Helena and Babá from the party. He was elected by journalists, five times in a row, the best federal deputy of Brazil, receiving the Prêmio Congresso em Foco (Congress in Focus Prize) award. On 17 April 2016, he voted against the opening of the impeachment process of former president Dilma Rousseff.

He was again elected as a Councillor of Rio de Janeiro on 2020 Rio de municipal election with 49,422 votes, having a term at the Municipal Chamber of Rio de Janeiro for two years (2021-23) until he was reelected for a fifth term as a federal deputy on 2022 Rio de Janeiro state elections, with 115,023 votes.

Electoral history

Chamber of Deputies

Municipal Chamber of Rio de Janeiro

2018 Rio de Janeiro senatorial election

Legislative Assembly of Rio de Janeiro

Rio de Janeiro mayoral elections

References

1949 births
Living people
Brazilian Democratic Movement politicians
Workers' Party (Brazil) politicians
Socialism and Liberty Party politicians
Politicians from Rio de Janeiro (city)
Fluminense Federal University alumni
Members of the Chamber of Deputies (Brazil) from Rio de Janeiro (state)
Members of the Legislative Assembly of Rio de Janeiro